Poplar Creek may refer to:

Places
Poplar Creek, British Columbia, unincorporated community
Poplar Creek, Mississippi, unincorporated community
Poplar Creek Music Theater, Hoffman Estates, Illinois
Poplar Creek Public Library District, Illinois

Creeks
Poplar Creek (British Columbia), a tributary of the Lardeau River
Poplar Creek (Florida), a tributary to East Bay
Poplar Creek (Illinois), a tributary of the Fox River (Illinois River tributary)
Poplar Creek (Tennessee), a tributary of the Clinch River
Poplar Creek (Dan River tributary), a stream in Halifax County, Virginia